Verzura is an Italian surname. Notable people with the surname include:

Antonio Verzura (born 1992), Thailand-born Italian footballer
Gionata Verzura (born 1992), Thailand-born Italian footballer, twin brother of Antonio

Italian-language surnames